Giovanni Sercambi (1348–1424) was an Italian author from Lucca who wrote a history of his city, Le croniche di Luccha, as well as Il novelliere (or Novelle), a collection of 155 tales. 

Sercambi composed Le croniche di Luccha from  until his death from plague in 1424.

The unfinished Il novelliere has a frame story based on Boccaccio's Decameron, in which the storytellers flee the Lucca to avoid the plague of 1374. One of the stories, La novella d'Astolfo, is notable for showing parallels with the tale of Shahriyar and Shahzaman in the One Thousand and One Nights.

References

Sources

Myriam Swennen Ruthenberg "Telling Lies, Telling Lives: Giovanni Sercambi Between Cronaca and Novella" in The Italian Novella, ed. Gloria Allaire (Western Michigan University Press, 2003)
Robert Irwin The Arabian Nights: A Companion (Tauris Parkes Paperbacks, 2005)

1348 births
1424 deaths
Italian male writers
Writers from Lucca